Johan Linus Eklöw, (born 29 August 1979) better known by his stage name Style of Eye, is a Swedish DJ, record producer, and songwriter. He is part of the electronic music group Galantis.

He has worked with Usher, Kylie Minogue, Lily Allen, Zedd, Miike Snow, Slagsmålsklubben, Tom Staar, Lars Allertz, Soso, and many more through collaborations and/or remixes. His early 2013 single Taken Over, featuring Rebecca & Fiona, peaked at 33 on the Swedish charts. In 2013, Linus teamed up with Christian Karlsson of Miike Snow to form the super duo, Galantis. On April 23, 2014, Linus was awarded at ASCAP's 31st Annual Pop Music Awards for Icona Pop's international hit, "I Love It" featuring Charli XCX, which he co-wrote and produced alongside Patrik Berger.

Footprints, his second full length released in October 2014 on Ultra Records, was nominated for a Swedish Grammy. The album includes the released singles: Kids (which went platinum in Sweden), The Game, and Love Looks.

Biography

Early life and career
Linus Eklöw was raised in Stockholm, Sweden. His early musical influences included a range of styles: from Stevie Wonder, classical composer Edvard Grieg, soul music, and jazz; electronic musicians Yello and Kraftwerk; to drum & bass producers DJ Hype, DJ Zinc, Photek, and Roni Size. Linus began experimenting with production as early as 14 years old, creating "weird downtempo and trip hop" songs, as well as spinning drum & bass at his school discos. “I’m always looking to connect dots from my own history,” Linus explains.

2000s
Eklöw started his house music career in 2003, when he released tracks on Derrick Carter's Chicago label, Classic. During these early years, Linus made "Chicago Jackin'" House music with "Swedish refinement and high energy flair," and performed at various underground shows in Chicago.

In 2007, John Dahlbäck signed Linus’ single "H-Bomb" to his Pickadoll label, that was the beginning for a run of releases that in 2008 would see the release of Style of Eye's debut full-length "Duck, Cover And Hold," in addition to its first single: “Girls”. The album contained 13 tracks that spanned such genres as: Minimal House to nu-trance, all geared towards the dance floor and eventually won the P3-Guld and The Manifest Prize for Best Dance Recording in 2009. 2008 was also the year that Claude VonStroke and his Dirtybird imprint released Linus' The Big Kazoo EP (a first Beatport 10 entry for Eklöw), which was followed up the next year by The Race EP.

2010–present
“I’m always about high-energy with a need to push things forward,” says Linus. Releases like "Puss Puss," "We Are Boys" and "Sexx" on Refune Music, his "Wet/Dry" EP on French imprint Sound Pellegrino lead to Skrillex requesting Linus to create the song “Devastate” for the Free Treats Vol II compilation on Skrillex's OWSLA label. In addition, Linus's “Homeless” track alongside Slagsmålsklubben for A-Trak's Fool's Gold was followed up this year with his debut EP on the label, “Ray Dee Oh.”

Linus also was behind the scenes, writing and producing tracks for artists such as Icona Pop (Linus co-wrote the international song "I Love It" as well as much of their forthcoming album), Fenech Soler, and remixed various notable hits: Swedish House Mafia's Save The World, Kylie's Timebomb and Miike Snow's The Wave.

Linus has been an international DJ, gigging at major festivals and club events throughout the world. Eklöw has performed at: Swedish House Mafia's show at the 35,000 capacity Friends Arena in Stockholm, Pier 94 in New York, Tomorrowland, Mysteryland, Snowbombing and Sunburn Festival in India.

Linus teamed up with Christian Karlsson of Miike Snow near the end of 2013 to form the group Galantis, and released their self-titled debut EP (it hit #4 on the iTunes dance chart and was #8 on Shazam's chart of the most Shazamed songs at Miami Music Week). They then took their Galantis live show on the road across the US, including two performances at Coachella's Gobi stage in April 2014. As of May 5, 2014, Galantis has finished most of the songwriting of their first full-length album.

For Eklöw's upcoming second LP entitled "Footprints," various singles have already been released as of August 11, 2014: ‘After Dark’, ‘Kids’, ‘The Game’ and ‘Love Looks’; as well as a track list and album artwork.

Discography

Studio albums

EPs
Source:

Mix albums
 Hipp-E and Style Of Eye - "Winter Sessions 2" (OM Records - 2008)
 Justin Martin, Klaus Hill & Style Of Eye - "The Underground" (Ministry Of Sound (Australia) - 2009)
 "Ministry Of Sound: The Club Presents Style Of Eye" (Ministry Of Sound - 2010)

Singles

As featured artist

Remixes
 "Roar (Style of Eye Remix)" - Axwell & Sebastian Ingrosso (Walt Disney Records - 2013)
 "Open Your Eyes (Style of Eye Remix)" - Alex Metric & Steve Angello (Virgin UK - 2011)
 "Save The World (Style of Eye & Carli Remix)" - Swedish House Mafia featuring John Martin (singer) (Virgin UK - 2011)
 "Go Tigers (Style of Eye Remix)" - Tony Senghore (Midnight Munchies - 2011)
 "Ohrwurm (Style of Eye Remix)" - Tommy Trash (Downright - 2011)
 "I Love It (Style of Eye Remix)" - Icona Pop featuring Charli XCX (Big Beat Records - 2012)
 "Manners (Style of Eye Remix)" - Icona Pop (Big Beat Records - 2012)
 "Summer Life (Style of Eye Remix)" - The Penelopes (Pour Le Monde Ltd - 2012)
 "Timebomb (Style Of Eye Remix)" - Kylie Minogue (Astralwerks - 2012)
 "The Wave (Style of Eye Remix)" - Miike Snow (Universal Republic Records - 2012)
 "Bonanza (Style of Eye Remix)" - Mayka (Uniform Beat - 2012)
 "Who's Gonna Love Me (Style of Eye Remix)" - Soso (PNC Do It Yourself Bitch - 2012)
 "Clarity (Style Of Eye Remix)" - Zedd featuring Foxes (Interscope Records - 2013)

References

External links
 

Swedish DJs
Remixers
1979 births
Living people
Galantis members
Electronic dance music DJs